The Kwanza River, also known as the Coanza, the Quanza, and the Cuanza, is one of the longest rivers in Angola. It empties into the Atlantic Ocean just south of the national capital Luanda.

Geography
Its tributaries included the Cutato and Lucala.

History
The river's navigable lower course was the original route of Portugal invasion into northern Angola.

The Capanda Dam in Malanje Province was finished in 2004, providing hydroelectric power to the region and assisting its irrigation. The  Cambambe Dam and the Lauca Dam were also constructed on the river. The Caculo Cabaça Hydroelectric Power StationCaculo Cabaça Dam is under construction with estimated completion in 2024. The Barra do Kwanza, the mouth of the river is gradually being developed for tourism, including a golf course.

The Church of Nossa Senhora da Victoria stands near the banks of the Kwanza River in Massanganu, Province of Cuanza-Norte, Angola.

Wildlife
Rich biodiversity has been found in the Angolan river, according to research reported on the Science and Development Network website. Angola's first biodiversity tally of the Kwanza River has so far found 50 fish species. Researchers from the National Fishing Research Institute and the South African Institute for Aquatic Biodiversity say genetic testing may reveal new species. Sportfishing includes tarpon.

Legacy
Angola's currency, the kwanza, is named after the river. The river is also the namesake of the provinces of Cuanza Norte ("Cuanza North") and Cuanza Sul ("Cuanza South").

See also
 Quissama National Park, to the south of the river

References

Citations

Bibliography
 .

External links 
 Map of the Cuanza River basin at Water Resources eAtlas

Rivers of Angola